The New Ross Standard is a local newspaper published once per week (every Tuesday) in County Wexford, Ireland.

It is published in colour.

The newspaper was first published in the late-19th century. In recent years, it has also been made available as an ePaper which can be accessed digitally.

It contains stories relating primarily to New Ross town and its surrounding area, as well as stories relating to County Wexford and to a lesser extent County Kilkenny. The topics covered are wide-ranging. It also contains many photographs, which are published in colour. It has Advertisements and Sports sections. It also publishes Court reports. It is the best selling regional newspaper in the New Ross area.

Currently, it is a member of the Independent Newspaper, Periodical, Book, and Directory Publishers Industry.

References

1889 establishments in Ireland
Independent News & Media
Mass media in County Wexford
Standard
Newspapers published in the Republic of Ireland
Publications established in 1889
Weekly newspapers published in Ireland